JWR may refer to:
 Jewish World Review
 Jody Wilson-Raybould
 Johore Wooden Railway
 Jinhua–Wenzhou Railway
 Jinwen Railway Corporation
 Junior world record
 J. W. Roberts Ltd., a defunct company involved in the Armley asbestos disaster